Ithomi may refer to several places in Greece:

Ithomi, Karditsa, a Municipal Unit in the Mouzaki Municipality of the Karditsa Regional Unit
Ithomi, Messenia, a Municipal Unit in the Messeni Municipality of the Messenia Regional Unit

See also
Ithome (disambiguation)